Chimelong Group Co., Ltd. is a Chinese company that owns and operates theme parks in China. The company also owns restaurants, hotels, and other businesses. It is one of the leading Chinese amusement park operators. The company was founded in 1989 by Su Zhigang, a local resident in Panyu, Guangzhou, Guangdong, who first established Xiangjiang Restaurant, his first enterprise under Chimelong Group, prior to its upgrading into the current Xiangjiang Hotel in 1994. Inspired by his success in the catering business, Su, after several field research visits to safari parks overseas, soon set up his mind to open a private zoo; his aim was to allow the Chinese citizens to see wildlife from all over the world, without going abroad. This gave birth to the establishment of Chimelong Safari Park, formerly known as Xiangjiang Safari Park in Guangzhou, China, the biggest wildlife theme park in Asia at present.

The headquarters is located on the grounds of Guangzhou Chimelong Tourist Resort in Panyu District, Guangzhou.

Properties

Guangzhou
Guangzhou Chimelong Tourist Resort is located in Guangzhou, Guangdong, China.

 Attractions
 Chimelong Paradise, home of the 10 Inversion Roller Coaster and Dive Coaster
 Chimelong International Circus
 Chimelong Water Park
 Chimelong Safari Park, birthplace of the world's only surviving panda triplets
 Chimelong Birds Park
 Hotels
Chimelong Hotel
Chimelong Panda Hotel
Panyu Xiangjiang Hotel

Zhuhai
Chimelong International Ocean Resort is located in Hengqin, Zhuhai, China and opened in 2014.
 Attractions
Chimelong Ocean Kingdom
 Hengqin Theatre, Circus
Chimelong Theater
Chimelong Marine Science Park - Under Construction
 Hotels
 Chimelong Hengqin Bay Hotel
 Chimelong Penguin Hotel
 Chimelong Circus Hotel
 Chimelong Ying Hai Hotel and Apartments
Chimelong Marine Science Hotel

Qingyuan
Chimelong Qingyuan Forest Resort is located in Qingyuan, Guangdong, China and is under construction. The park will feature an 88-metre tall building named “Giraffe Castle” and the world's largest aviary, occupying an area of 5 hectares. The four-themed hotels will provide a total of 3,500 rooms.
Attractions
Chimelong Forest Kingdom
Hotels
Giraffe Hotel
Elephant Hotel
Zebra Hotel
Rhino Hotel

References

External links
 Chimelong 
 About Chimelong (English)

Conglomerate companies of China
Companies based in Guangzhou
Chinese companies established in 1988
Amusement park companies
Amusement park developers
Privately held companies of China
Chinese brands
Entertainment companies established in 1988